Tapaphaipun Chaisri (born November 29, 1989) is a member of the Thailand women's national volleyball team.

Career
In the 2009 Asian University Games, she won the Most Valuable Player award. She became the 2012–13 Thailand League Most Valuable Player and 2014 Indonesia Proliga Best Spiker.

Chaisri played with the Thai club Khonkaen Star in 2017 on loan.

Clubs

  Idea Khonkaen (2006–2013)
  PV Oil Thái Bình (2009)
  Jakarta Pertamina (2013–2014)
  Sisaket (2013–2014)
  Thai-Denmark (2015–2017)
  Khonkaen Star (2017–)

Awards

Individual
 2006 Thailand League "Best Libero
 2009 Asian University Games – "Most Valuable Player" 
 2012–13 Thailand League "Most Valuable Player"
 2013 Summer Universiade "Best Receiver"
 2014 Indonesia League "Best Server"
 2014 Indonesia League "Best Spiker"
 2018–19 Thailand League "Best Libero"

Clubs
  2009 Asian Club Championship –  Champion, with Federbrau
  2010 Asian Club Championship –  Champion, with Federbrau
  2011 Asian Club Championship –  Champion, with Chang
 2012–13 Thailand League –  Champion, with Idea Khonkaen
 2013 Thai–Denmark Super League –  Champion, with Idea Khonkaen
 2013–14 Indonesia League –  Champion, with Jakarta Pertamina
 2019 Thai–Denmark Super League –  Third, with Khonkaen Star
 2020 Thailand League –  Runner-up, with Khonkaen Star

Royal decorations
 2013 –  Commander (Third Class) of The Most Exalted Order of the White Elephant

References

1989 births
Living people
Tapaphaipun Chaisri
Tapaphaipun Chaisri
Thai expatriates in Indonesia
Asian Games medalists in volleyball
Volleyball players at the 2014 Asian Games
Tapaphaipun Chaisri
Universiade medalists in volleyball
Tapaphaipun Chaisri
Medalists at the 2014 Asian Games
Tapaphaipun Chaisri
Southeast Asian Games medalists in volleyball
Competitors at the 2011 Southeast Asian Games
Competitors at the 2013 Southeast Asian Games
Universiade bronze medalists for Thailand
Medalists at the 2013 Summer Universiade